This is a list of the current 63 members of the Althing (Icelandic Parliament), from 2021 until the present.

Election results

References

Lists of Members of the Althing
Iceland